Dangerous Orphans is a 1986 New Zealand action film directed by John Laing.

Synopsis
Harry, Moir and Rossi after growing up together orphanage, as adults they pull off the occasional heist together. They plan an international heist to avenge the killing of one of their fathers.

Cast

Reviews
 1986 Variety.

References

External links
 

1986 action films
1980s New Zealand films
Films set in New Zealand
Films shot in New Zealand
1980s English-language films